Albert Jeck (* July 3 1935 in Lindau) is a German economist.

Life 
Albert Jeck was the son of a teacher of the same name. From 1941 to 1953 he attended elementary and high school in his birthplace of Lindau on Lake Constance. He then studied national economy at the University of Munich, where he passed the diploma in economics in 1958 and worked as a research assistant at the State Economics Seminar the following year.

After the graduation to Dr. oec. publ. in Munich on April 8, 1962, and Habilitation there in 1968, from 1969 to 2000 he was Professor for Theoretical Economics and Director at the Institute for Economics in Kiel. His work focused on distribution theory, growth theory and the history of theory.

Publications (selection) 
 Die Determinanten der Einkommensverteilung. Ein Beitrag zur neueren Verteilungstheorie. München 1962 
 Wachstum und Verteilung des Volkseinkommens. Untersuchungen und Materialien zur Entwicklung der Einkommensverteilung in Deutschland 1870–1913. Mit 15 Abbildungen. Tübingen 1970, ISBN 3-16-330361-7.
 with Harald Hagemann: Wachstum und Einkommensverteilung. Strukturanalyse auf der Basis eines dreisektoralen Modells vom Lowe-Feldman-Dobb-Typ. Kiel 1981
 Anmerkungen und Lesehilfen zur Ricardo-Interpretation. Zahlenmodell und Detaildisposition der Principles. Kiel 1986 
 The macrostructure of Adam Smith's theoretical system: a reconstruction. The European Journal of the History of Economic Thought, 1994, vol. 1 (3), pp. 551–576

Individual proofs 

1935 births
German economists
Living people